Chaloem Phra Kiat is a district (amphoe) of Buriram province, northeastern Thailand.

History
The district was created on 5 December 1996, together with four other districts and renamed Chaloem Phra Kiat in celebration of the 50th anniversary of King Bhumibol Adulyadej's ascension to the throne.

The district was composed of the tambons Charoen Suk, Ta Pek and Isan Khet of Nang Rong district and tambon Thawon and Yai Yaem Watthana of Lahan Sai district.

Geography
Neighboring districts are (from the east clockwise) Prakhon Chai, Lahan Sai and Nang Rong.

Motto
The Chaloem Phra Kiat District's motto is "City of Phanom Rung, field of yellow cotton flowers, the royal district's name, Narai lintel, Prasat Tong Shrine, Poo Ak-kha-nee cloth."

Administration
The district is divided into five sub-districts (tambons), which are further subdivided into 71 villages (mubans). Phanom Rung is a township (thesaban tambon) which covers almost the complete tambon Ta Pek and parts of tambon Isan Khet. There are a further four tambon administrative organizations (TAO).

References

External links
amphoe.com

Chaloem Phra Kiat